Lake Conroe is a  lake in Montgomery County, Texas, United States. Even though it is named Lake Conroe, only a small portion of the lake is in Conroe, Texas. Most of the lake is in unincorporated Montgomery County. The lake lies on the West Fork of the San Jacinto River, just west of Interstate 45 off State Highway 105 in Montgomery and Walker counties. Lake Conroe is a popular attraction for boating, jet-skiing and fishing.

Situation

The lake runs through classic East Texas Piney Woods forests. The controlling authority of the lake is the San Jacinto River Authority. The City of Houston owns a two-thirds interest in the lake; the SJRA owns one-third.

Lake Conroe was conceived in 1970 as an alternative water supply for the City of Houston. The lake was completed in January 1973; it was filled on October 31, 1973.

A few celebrities, such as Rudy Tomjanovich, Roger Clemens, Aaron Gray, Colin Edwards, and Lieutenant Governor Dan Patrick, have residences in the Lake Conroe area.

References

External links
Texas Parks and Wildlife - Lake Conroe
San Jacinto River Authority - Lake Conroe
About Lake Conroe
Lake Conroe Community Website

Protected areas of Montgomery County, Texas
Conroe
Protected areas of Walker County, Texas
Bodies of water of Walker County, Texas
Bodies of water of Montgomery County, Texas